The Batallón de Inteligencia 601 (Spanish for "601 Intelligence Battalion") was a special military intelligence service of the Argentine Army whose structure was set up in the late 1970s, active in the Dirty War and Operation Condor, and disbanded in 2000. Its personnel infiltrated and collected information on guerrilla groups and human rights organisations; and coordinated killings, kidnappings and other abuses.

The Batallón was under the orders of Guillermo Suárez Mason and ultimately reported to junta leader Leopoldo Galtieri. The unit took part in Luis García Meza Tejada's Cocaine Coup in Bolivia in 1980 and trained Contra units in Lepaterique base in Honduras in the 1980s. It also trained members of the Honduran Battalion 316.

Declassification of documents
On 1 January 2010, President Cristina Fernández of Argentina ordered that documents pertaining to Batallón 601 be declassified. The documents presented before federal Judge Ariel Lijo contain data on 3,952 civilians, from university professors to concierges, and 345 army personnel who worked for Battalion 601, according to the director of the National Archive of Memory.

See also
Agustín Feced
Archivo Nacional de la Memoria
Argentine Army
Dirty War
National Commission on the Disappearance of Persons
Operation Charly
Operation Condor
Army Intelligence Service

References

External links
 Declassified US Department of State files

1980s in Argentina
Anti-communism in Argentina
Army units and formations of Argentina
Defunct Argentine intelligence agencies
Counterterrorism in Argentina
Operation Condor
Political repression in Argentina
1970s in Argentina
1990s in Argentina
2000s in Argentina